Abraham Buchanan Addams, Jr. (July 12, 1926 – December 10, 2017) was an American football end who played for the Detroit Lions. He played college football at Indiana University, having previously attended Louisville Male High School. He died on December 10, 2017 at the age of 91.

References

1926 births
2017 deaths
American football defensive ends
Indiana Hoosiers football players
Detroit Lions players
Players of American football from Louisville, Kentucky